The president of the II Chamber of the Landtag of Saxony was the presiding officer of the lower chamber of that legislature.

References

Landtag II,Presidents
Saxony,Landtag II,Presidents